Herman Jules Koehler (July 15, 1873 – September–December 1931) was an American college football player, amateur ice hockey player and outdoorsman.

Biography
Koehler was born in Upper Montclair, New Jersey on July 15, 1873.

Koehler was an experienced outdoorsman and made several trips across Labrador and northern Quebec. He is believed to have died sometime between September and December in 1931 while trying to pass Labrador from Kuujjuaq with fellow New Jerseyman Fred Connell and guide Jimmy Martin from Cartwright. Koehler's and Connell's bodies were found five kilometers apart while Martin's body was never found.

University of North Carolina

He was a prominent end for the North Carolina Tar Heels football team of the University of North Carolina. He was selected second-team for an all-time Carolina football team in 1934. Dr. Joel Whitaker put him on his all-time team, ranking him the second best end in the history of the school up to that time. He notes that Koehler came to the University with experience, for he played on the Orange Athletic Club with Frank Coyne.

Koehler was selected All-Southern in 1898 and 1899.

Ice hockey

Koehler was also an amateur ice hockey player with his hometown team Montclair Athletic Club in Montclair, New Jersey. He captained the team during the 1896–97 season, and also appeared with the team in the American Amateur Hockey League in 1897–98 and 1898–99.

References

American football ends
North Carolina Tar Heels football players
All-Southern college football players
19th-century players of American football
Living people
People from Montclair, New Jersey
Year of birth missing (living people)